Meo Abbracciavacca was an Italian poet from Pistoia who died in 1313. Dante Gabriel Rossetti translated two of Abbracciavacca's poems into English in his work titled The Early Italian Poets From Ciullo D'Alcamo to Dante Alighieri (1100-1200-1300): Canzone. He will be silent and watchful in his Love (translation of original Italian verse starting "Madonna, vostra altera canoscenza") and Ballatta. His Life is by Contraries (translation of verse starting "Per lunga dimoranza").

Selected extracts

(first stanza as printed on page 5 of Poeti del primo secolo della lingua italianna in due volumi raccolti by Lodovico Valeriani and  Urbano Lampredi, 1816)

References

External links
Meo Abbracciavacca, da Pistoia. “Ballata. His Life is by Contraries.” by Dante Gabriel Rossetti
Madonna vostra altera canoscenza English translation by Dante Gabriel Rossetti
Poeti del primo secolo della lingua italiana in due volumi raccolti containing Italian verses collected and published in 1816

13th-century Italian poets
1313 deaths
Italian male poets
People from Pistoia
Year of birth unknown